Alick Robin Walsham Harrison CBE (15 November 1900 – 18 May 1969) was an English academic, Warden of Merton College, Oxford, from 1963 until his death in 1969.

Life

Robin Harrison was born on 15 November 1900 in Hambledon, Surrey and was educated at Haileybury and Merton College, Oxford. He became a master at Westminster School and returned to Merton in 1930. In 1932 he married Margaret, eldest daughter of Sir David Ross. He was a nephew of Sir Francis Younghusband and a cousin of Eileen Younghusband. At the start of the Second World War he entered government service in the Ministry of Food, where he became Deputy Director of Public Relations and Private Secretary to the minister Lord Woolton. He was awarded an OBE in 1943 and made a CBE in 1950. That year he returned to Merton to take up his old job as Fellow and Tutor in Ancient History. He served for a time as Domestic Bursar and was elected Warden in 1963. He was involved in university planning and helped in the foundation of two new colleges, Wolfson and St. Cross. He was made an honorary fellow of both.

He was the author of various academic books mainly dealing with law in the ancient world, including The Law of Athens.  He was a man of "untiring scholarship, good sense, and sound judgment".

Harrison died on 18 May 1969 in Oxford.

References

External links

Alumni of Merton College, Oxford
Fellows of Merton College, Oxford
Wardens of Merton College, Oxford
People educated at Haileybury and Imperial Service College
1900 births
1970 deaths
Commanders of the Order of the British Empire
English antiquarians
People from the Borough of Waverley
20th-century antiquarians